Adolph Edward "Eddiebong" Galido Plaza (born August 21, 1962) is a Filipino politician. He currently serves as a member of the Philippine House of Representatives representing the 2nd District of Agusan del Sur.

Political career

House of Representatives (2019–present)

References 

Living people
Governors of Agusan del Sur
Members of the House of Representatives of the Philippines from Agusan del Sur
National Unity Party (Philippines) politicians
People from Agusan del Sur
1962 births